The Hour of Two Lights is a one-off collaborative album between British solo-artist Terry Hall, formerly of the 2 Tone and ska revival band the Specials, and Mushtaq, a member of British-based multi-ethnic hip-hop–ethno-techno–world fusion music group Fun-Da-Mental.

Composition and release
The album was written and produced by the duo, with the exception of "Ten Eleven" which was written with Oujdi and Hall's regular collaborator and label-boss of Honest Jon's, Damon Albarn. Receiving good reviews, the album was released on CD and double-LP by Albarn's Honest Jon's label in Europe (distributed by EMI) and the US (distributed by Astralwerks) in August 2003.

It was Hall's last release of new material, after which he rejoined the Specials as a regular member for live performances, until the release of the Specials' album Encore in 2019.

Critical response

Robin Denselow of The Guardian rated it 4/5 and said of The Hour of Two Lights, "Two of the pioneers of multicultural British pop are back with a daring, thoughtful set..." Ollie Davies of BBC Music said, "It's a political and musical recording of racial minorities and cultures by two of today's pioneers of modern popular music." Sean Westergaard of AllMusic rated One and One Is One 3/5 and thought "Terry Hall took quite a chance on this one, doing something unlike anything in his catalog and pulling it off without a hitch. Well done."

Jeff Brown of CMJ New Music Monthly called it "...a fantastic mélange of East and West, traditional and modernmusic." Uncut rated it 4/5 and called it "...a fantastic record of banging global grooves..." PopMatters of Will Harris thought "The Hour of Two Lights can expand one's musical horizons considerably."

Track listing

Personnel

 Terry Hall – vocals, banjo, jaw-harp
 Mushtaq – darabuka, drums, keyboards, percussion

Additional musicians
 Damon Albarn – voice, melodica
 Louai Alhenawi – ney
 Abdul Latif Assaly – voice
 Nathalie Barghach – voice 
 Sammy Bishai – violin
 Calum Cook – cello
 James Dring – recorder
 A.K.Durvesh – shehnai
 Numan Elyer – percussion 
 Eva Katzler – voice
 Matthew Kent – scratch deejaying
 Hajaj Kenway – percussion
 Eddie Morden – clarinet
 Oujdi – rap 
 Herinderpal Panesar – dhol
 Romany Rad – accordion, bass, guitar, voice
 Zoe Rahman – piano
 Mazin Abu Sayf – oud, accordion

Technical
 Terry Hall – producer, mixing
 Mushtaq – producer, mixing
 Tom Girling – engineer, mixing
 James Dring – assistant engineer
 Will Bankhead – photography, design
 John Ainley – drawing
 Elizabeth Cook – drawing
 Len Wheeler – drawing

References

External links

2003 albums
Terry Hall (singer) albums
Mushtaq Omar Uddin albums
Honest Jon's Records albums